The Fairbanks Exploration Company Dredge No. 2 is a historic gold mining dredge in a remote area of Fairbanks North Star Borough, Alaska, northeast of the city of Fairbanks. It is currently located on the north bank of Fish Creek, shortly northeast of the mouth of Slippery Creek. All of its original operating equipment was reported to be in place in 1999. The dredge was built in 1927 by the Bethlehem Steel Company, and assembled for use in Alaska in 1928. It was operated by the Fairbanks Exploration Company in the Goldstream Valley from 1928 to 1949, and on Fairbanks Creek and lower Fish Creek from 1950 to 1961.

See also
National Register of Historic Places listings in Fairbanks North Star Borough, Alaska

References

1928 establishments in Alaska
Buildings and structures completed in 1928
Gold mining in Alaska
Industrial buildings and structures on the National Register of Historic Places in Alaska
Industrial equipment on the National Register of Historic Places
Gold dredges
Buildings and structures on the National Register of Historic Places in Fairbanks North Star Borough, Alaska
Buildings and structures completed in 1927